Dean & Britta is a musical duo consisting of Dean Wareham and Britta Phillips, both former members of Luna. Wareham had formed Luna in 1991 after leaving his first band, Galaxie 500. Phillips joined Luna in 2000, replacing bassist Justin Harwood.

History
Their first album started out as a Wareham solo project, but when he heard Phillips' demos, he asked her to join him. L'Avventura was produced by Tony Visconti and released on Jetset Records in 2003, under the name "Britta Phillips & Dean Wareham". After hearing the album, Peter Kember (a.k.a. Sonic Boom) fell in love with it and did a remix mini-LP, Sonic Souvenirs, also released on Jetset Records.

After Luna broke up in 2005, Dean & Britta spent the next year working on film scores, most notably for Noah Baumbach's movie, 
The Squid and the Whale, and promoting the documentary film of Luna's farewell tour Tell Me Do You Miss Me. They were married during the recording of their album Back Numbers, also produced by Visconti, and simplified their band name to "Dean & Britta". Back Numbers was released on Rounder Records in February 2007, followed by a limited edition EP, Words You Used to Say. In 2006, Dean and Britta did a Take-Away Show video session, shot by Vincent Moon.

In 2008, Dean & Britta covered The Cure's "Friday I'm In Love" for American Laundromat Records' tribute compilation Just Like Heaven: A Tribute to The Cure.

Discography

Studio albums
L'Avventura (2003)
Back Numbers (2007)
13 Most Beautiful: Songs for Andy Warhol's Screen Tests (2010)
Quarantine Tapes (2020)

EPs
Sonic Souvenirs (2004)
Words You Used to Say (2006)
Variations  (2008)

Soundtracks
The Squid and the Whale (2005)
Tenure (2009)
Mistress America (2015)

References

External links
Article from NPR's 'World Cafe' program
Interview at Stylus magazine 
Dean and Britta on MySpace
Men's Vogue interview with Dean and Britta
Handwritten interview with Dean & Britta at ifpthendirt
Kevchino Interview with Dean & Britta
Interview with Dean Wareham on Crikey.com.au

Indie rock musical groups from New York (state)
Musical groups established in 2003
Zoë Records artists
Married couples